Elias Yfantis (born 29 July 1936) is a Greek former professional football player who played as a striker and a later manager of Olympiacos. He was a key member of Olympiacos during the 1950's and 1960's.

Biography
Born in Aghia Sophia in Piraeus, Yfantis joined the senior side of Olympiacos F.C. at the age of 17. He played for the first time in an official match in 1953. He played as a forward and scored 225 career goals in all competitions. In A'Ethniki, he not only played in 58 games in three seasons and scored 30 goals, but he had also scored first for the historic struggle of Olympiacos in European competition against AC Milan (final score 2–2). Serious injuries forced him to quit football in 1964 at the age of 28.

He made seven appearances and scored two goals for the Greece national football team, playing from 1957 to 1960.

In 1970, he became the head coach of Olympiacos as caretaker manager, and later for many years in parts of the infrastructure of the club.

Honours

Olympiacos
Panhellenic Championship: 1953–54, 1954–55, 1955–56, 1956–57, 1957–58, 1958–59
Greek Cup: 1953–54, 1956–57, 1957–58, 1958–59, 1959–60, 1960–61, 1962–63
Piraeus' League: 1954, 1955, 1956, 1957, 1958, 1959

References

1936 births
Living people
Greek footballers
Greece international footballers
Greek football managers
Super League Greece players
Olympiacos F.C. players
Olympiacos F.C. managers
Association football forwards
Footballers from Piraeus
Ethnikos Piraeus F.C. players